The Big Deal is an Irish reality talent competition programme which aired from 4 September to 10 October 2021 on Virgin Media One.

Production 
Virgin Media Television announced The Big Deal in June 2021 for a six-episode run. The programme would be presented by Vogue Williams, and feature Aston Merrygold, Boy George, Deirdre O'Kane, Jedward, and Lyra as judges. It was filmed at the 3Arena in Dublin.

The series is a co-production with Fox Alternative Entertainment—the non-scripted production arm of U.S. television network Fox, and BiggerStage—an agency led by former managing director of Virgin Media Television Pat Kiely. Fox's president of alternative entertainment and specials Rob Wade explained that it had become more cost-effective to co-fund an initial run of a new, in-house format in a test market with similar demographics to the United States, than to produce one-off pilots. He explained that its performance in Ireland could then be used to help pitch the format to broadcasters, such as Fox and other potential international broadcasters. In September 2022, Deadline Hollywood reported that Fox was developing a U.S. version of the format under the title Fame or Fortune.

Format 
After performing for a panel of judges, acts must choose to either take a cash buyout and leave the show, or decline it for a chance to qualify for the series finale, where they could win the €50,000 grand prize.

See also 

 Walk the Line

References 

2020s Irish television series
2021 Irish television series debuts
2021 Irish television series endings
Irish reality television series
Television series by Fox Entertainment
Virgin Media Television (Ireland) original programming
English-language television shows